Josh Dolley (born 19 May 1992) is a South African cricketer. He played in one List A match for Eastern Province in 2012.

See also
 List of Eastern Province representative cricketers

References

External links
 

1992 births
Living people
South African cricketers
Eastern Province cricketers
Cricketers from Port Elizabeth